Cobra Records (together with its Artistic subsidiary) was an independent record label that operated from 1956–1959. The label launched the careers of Chicago blues artists Otis Rush, Magic Sam, and Buddy Guy and "signaled the arrival of a new generation of blues artists and a new sound... to be called the West Side Sound."

Cobra was started on Chicago's West Side in 1956 by Eli Toscano, a record-store- and television-repair-shop owner, with help from promoter Howard Bedno. When his previous record label, Abco Records, failed to generate much interest, Toscano approached Willie Dixon about working for Cobra. Dissatisfied with his arrangement with Chess Records, Dixon joined Cobra. There he served in many capacities, including talent scout, producer, arranger, songwriter, bassist, and became "the artistic vision behind Cobra Records."

First to record for Cobra was Otis Rush. His single "I Can't Quit You Baby" became a hit, spending six weeks in the Billboard R&B chart, where it reached number six in 1956. Rush recorded another seven singles for Cobra, described as "defining moments of Chicago blues." In 1957 Magic Sam recorded his signature song "All Your Love" and released four singles on Cobra. Buddy Guy released two singles in 1958 on Cobra's Artistic Records subsidiary.

From 1956–1958 Cobra issued singles by a variety of acts, including Ike Turner and several blues veterans. However, by 1959 financial troubles overtook the company and it went out of business. The Cobra catalogue was subsequently purchased by Stan Lewis of Jewel/Paula/Ron Records. Most of the Cobra (and Artistic) recordings (57 tracks, including several alternate and outtakes) were released on The Cobra Records Story: Chicago Rock and Blues 1956–1958 by Capricorn Records in 1993.  In 2013, 40 songs from the Cobra catalogue were released on a two-CD set, titled Double Trouble: The Cobra Record Story.

Discography

Cobra Records

Artistic Records

Abco Records

References

Bibliography

American record labels
Blues record labels
Record labels established in 1956
Record labels disestablished in 1959